Sébastien Léger is a French house DJ and producer. His singles "Hit Girl", "Hypnotized" and "Aqualight" have become hit dance singles played in clubs across Europe. In March 2021, Magnetic Magazine placed his track "Firefly" at The 15 Best House Tracks  of February 2021.

Discography

Singles and albums

Exclusive tracks

Remixes

References

External links 
 Interview / FAQ with Sébastien Léger
 Ministry of Sound Radio
 Sébastien Léger Essential Mix
 Live DJ Sets Videos
 Sébastien Léger on SoundCloud

1979 births
French DJs
French house musicians
Living people
People from Breda
Electronic dance music DJs